Chikezie Jake "KZ" Okpala (born April 28, 1999) is a Nigerian-American professional basketball player who last played for the Sacramento Kings of the National Basketball Association (NBA). He played college basketball for the Stanford Cardinal.

Early life
Okpala was born to Nigerian parents Martin and Mary Okpala, who settled in Orange County, California before his birth. He began playing basketball at age 4 but did not join a youth league because he found them unruly. Okpala grew up playing the game against adults at fitness clubs and parks. When he was in fourth grade, his family moved from Fresno back to Orange County, living in Yorba Linda, where he reached out to a local club team. Okpala also played football and baseball in his childhood before focusing on basketball by age 11.

High school career
Okpala attended Esperanza High School in Anaheim, California. Okpala joined the starting lineup as a sophomore. On January 16, 2015, during that season, he made a buzzer-beating three-pointer to defeat El Dorado High School. As a junior, Okpala averaged 23 points and 8 rebounds per game to lead Esperanza to a conference title and win Crestview League Player of the Year honors. His most notable moment in that year was when Okpala dunked on Trevor Hooks of Orange High School.

In his senior season, he improved to 30 points, 11 rebounds, and 2 blocks per game. On November 25, 2016, Okpala tallied 41 points in a 76–59 win over Spartanburg Day School at the Tournament of Champions. He scored a career-high 46 points against Crossroads School, which set a school record. On March 26, 2017, Okpala led Esperanza to its first California Interscholastic Federation (CIF) Division II championship, scoring 22 points versus Moreau Catholic High School. He was named Crestview League Player of the Year and played at the Ballislife All-American Game.

Okpala was a consensus four-star recruit and one of the top high school players in California. He received an offer from Stanford in July 2016, shortly before committing there.

College career
Okpala missed his first 11 games of his freshman season at Stanford because of academic ineligibility. On December 21, 2017, after being cleared to play, he debuted with 6 points in 28 minutes against Kansas. On March 3, 2018, Okpala recorded his first double-double, tallying 18 points and 10 rebounds in an 84–83 win over Arizona State. He scored a season-high 23 points on March 8, in an 88–77 loss to UCLA. As a freshman, Okpala averaged 10 points, 3.7 rebounds, and 1.8 assists per game.

On November 6, 2018, he made his sophomore debut with 29 points, 10 rebounds, and 5 assists in a 96–74 win over Seattle. Six days later, Okpala earned Pac-12 Conference player of the week recognition. On January 9, 2019, he had another strong performance, erupting for 29 points, 6 rebounds, and 4 assists against Arizona.

At the conclusion of his sophomore season, Okpala announced his intention to forgo his final two seasons of collegiate eligibility and declare for the 2019 NBA Draft.

Professional career

Miami Heat (2019–2022)
Okpala was drafted by the Phoenix Suns with the 32nd overall pick in the 2019 NBA draft but was soon after traded to the Miami Heat. On July 7, 2019, Miami Heat announced that they had signed Okpala. He played in two of the Heat's first four games, but missed 19 games due to an Achilles strain. In December 2019, Okpala was assigned to the Heat's G League affiliate, the Sioux Falls Skyforce. He averaged 11.7 points, 7 rebounds, 2 assists, 1.4 steals and 1.1 blocks per game in 20 appearances with the Skyforce.

On August 1, 2021, Okpala joined the Heat for the NBA Summer League.

On February 9, 2022, Okpala was traded to the Oklahoma City Thunder for draft considerations. He was waived two days later.

Sacramento Kings (2022–2023)
On September 14, 2022, Okpala signed with the Sacramento Kings. On February 25, 2023, Okpala was waived.

Career statistics

NBA

Regular season

|-
| style="text-align:left;"| 
| style="text-align:left;"| Miami
| 5 || 0 || 5.2 || .600 || .000 || .500 || 1.0 || .2 || .4 || .2 || 1.4
|-
| style="text-align:left;"| 
| style="text-align:left;"| Miami
| 37 || 9 || 12.1 || .375 || .240 || .533 || 1.8 || .5 || .3 || .3 || 2.5
|-
| style="text-align:left;"| 
| style="text-align:left;"| Miami
| 21 || 0 || 11.6 || .435 || .346 || .727 || 2.0 || .7 || .2 || .3 || 3.7
|-
| style="text-align:left;"| 
| style="text-align:left;"| Sacramento
| 35 || 3 || 7.1 || .421 || .333 || .875 || 1.0 || .4 || .2 || .2 || 1.3
|- class="sortbottom"
| style="text-align:center;" colspan="2"| Career
| 98 || 12 || 9.8 || .409 || .286 || .667 || 1.5 || .5 || .2 || .3 || 2.3

Playoffs

|-
| style="text-align:left;"|2021
| style="text-align:left;"|Miami
| 2 || 0 || 3.0 || .000 || .000 || .000 || .0 || .0 || .0 || .0 || .0
|- class="sortbottom"
| style="text-align:center;" colspan="2"| Career
| 2 || 0 || 3.0 || .000 || .000 || .000 || .0 || .0 || .0 || .0 || .0

College

|-
| style="text-align:left;"| 2017–18
| style="text-align:left;"| Stanford
| 23 || 21 || 28.5 || .393 || .226 || .679 || 3.7 || 1.8 || 1.0 || .6 || 10.0
|-
| style="text-align:left;"| 2018–19
| style="text-align:left;"| Stanford
| 29 || 29 || 32.7 || .465 || .375 || .671 || 5.7 || 2.0 || 1.0 || .5 || 16.9
|- class="sortbottom"
| style="text-align:center;" colspan="2"| Career
| 52 || 50 || 30.8 || .440 || .336 || .674 || 4.8 || 1.9 || 1.0 || .5 || 13.9

References

External links

Stanford Cardinal bio

1999 births
Living people
21st-century African-American sportspeople
African-American basketball players
American men's basketball players
American sportspeople of Nigerian descent
Basketball players at the 2020 Summer Olympics
Basketball players from California
Miami Heat players
National Basketball Association players from Nigeria
Nigerian men's basketball players
Olympic basketball players of Nigeria
Phoenix Suns draft picks
Sacramento Kings players
Shooting guards
Sioux Falls Skyforce players
Small forwards
Sportspeople from Orange County, California
Stanford Cardinal men's basketball players